EA-3966 is a carbamate nerve agent. It is synthesized by reacting 2-dimethylaminomethyl-3-dimethylcarbamoxypyridine with 10-bromodecyltrimethylammonium bromide.

See also
3152 CT
EA-3887
EA-3990
EA-4056
T-1123
TL-1238

References

Carbamate nerve agents
Pyridines
Quaternary ammonium compounds
Acetylcholinesterase inhibitors
Bromides
Bisquaternary anticholinesterases
Aromatic carbamates